Toca may refer to:

 Toca, Boyacá, a municipality in Boyacá Department, Colombia
TOCA Touring Car series, a series of driving video games
TOCA, organisers and administrators of the British Touring Car Championship
Toca, an alternative name used in Italy for the wine grape Sauvignon vert
Toca, an alternative name for the Hungarian wine grape Furmint
Toca (album), an album from German dance project Fragma
Toca (spider), a genus of South American spiders

See also
"Toca-Toca", 2014 single by Romanian band Fly Project